Two is the second album by American soul/disco group GQ, released in 1980 on the Arista label.  It peaked at #9 on the R&B chart and #46 on the pop listing.  Unlike its predecessor Disco Nights, no single from this album crossed over to the Billboard Hot 100, but "Sitting in the Park" and "Standing Ovation" reached #9 and #12 respectively on the R&B chart.  The former was, like "I Do Love You" from Disco Nights, a cover of a 1965 Billy Stewart recording.

Track listing 
All songs written by Emanuel LeBlanc, Herb Lane, Keith Crier and Paul Service except where noted.
 "Standing Ovation" - 5:32
 "Is It Cool" - 4:05
 "Someday (In Your Life)" - 4:56
 "Lies" - 5:19
 "GQ Down" - 3:56
 "Don't Stop This Feeling" - 4:59
 "Reason for the Season" - 3:41
 "Sitting in the Park" (Billy Stewart) - 3:18
 "It's Like That" - 4:17

Personnel
Produced by: Larkin Arnold, Jimmy Simpson
Lead Guitar, Rhythm Guitar, Lead Vocals: Emmanuel Rahiem LeBlanc
Bass, Backing Vocals: Keith Crier
Keyboards, Backing Vocals: Herb Lane
Drums, Backing Vocals: Paul Service

Charts

Singles

References

1980 albums
GQ (band) albums
Arista Records albums